The 2014 Atlantic Hockey Tournament is the 10th Atlantic Hockey Tournament. It was played between March 7 and March 22, 2014, at campus locations and at the Blue Cross Arena in Rochester, New York. The winner of the tournament was the Robert Morris Colonials, who earned Atlantic Hockey's automatic bid to the 2014 NCAA Division I Men's Ice Hockey Tournament.

Format
The tournament features four rounds of play. In the first round the fifth and twelfth, sixth and eleventh, seventh and tenth, and eighth and ninth seeds, as determined by the conference regular-season standings, played a best-of-three series with the winners advancing to the quarterfinals. The top four teams from the conference regular-season standings received a bye to the quarterfinals. There, the first seed and lowest-ranked first-round winner, the second seed and second-lowest-ranked first-round winner, the third seed and second-highest-ranked first-round winner, and the fourth seed and the highest-ranked first-round winner played a best-of-three series, with the winners advancing to the semifinals. In the semifinals, the highest and lowest seeds and second-highest and second-lowest seeds played a single game each, with the winners advancing to the championship game. The tournament champion received an automatic bid to the 2014 NCAA Division I Men's Ice Hockey Tournament.

Standings
Note: GP = Games played; W = Wins; L = Losses; T = Ties; PTS = Points; GF = Goals For; GA = Goals Against

Bracket

Note: * denotes overtime period(s)

Results

First round

(5) Robert Morris vs. (12) Army

(6) Niagara vs. (11) American International

(7) Canisius vs. (10) Sacred Heart

(8) Holy Cross vs. (9) RIT

Quarterfinals

(1) Mercyhurst vs. (8) Holy Cross

(2) Bentley vs. (7) Canisius

(3) Air Force vs. (6) Niagara

(4) Connecticut vs. (5) Robert Morris

Semifinals

(1) Mercyhurst vs. (7) Canisius

(5) Robert Morris vs. (6) Niagara

Championship

(5) Robert Morris vs. (7) Canisius

Tournament awards

All-Tournament Team
G Dalton Izyk (Robert Morris).
D Doug Jessey (Canisius).
D Chris Rumble (Canisius).
F Ralph Cuddemi (Robert Morris).
F Greg Gibson (Robert Morris).
F Cody Wydo* (Robert Morris).
* Most Valuable Player(s)

References

Atlantic Hockey Tournament
Atlantic Hockey Tournament